Chinothele is a monotypic genus of east Asian mygalomorph spiders in the family Euagridae containing the single species, Chinothele jixiang. It was first described by K. Yu, S. Y. Zhang and F. Zhang in 2021, and it has only been found in China.

See also
 List of Euagridae species

References

Monotypic Euagridae genera
Spiders of China